Bapu Krishnarao Venkatesh Prasad (born 5 August 1969), is a former Indian cricketer, Cricket Coach , Commentator  who played Tests and ODIs. He made his debut in 1994. Primarily a right-arm medium-fast bowler, Prasad was noted for his bowling combination with Javagal Srinath.

He is the bowling coach for Kings XI Punjab in the Indian Premier League, having formerly performed the same role for the Indian cricket team from 2007 to 2009.

He currently serves as Deputy General Manager for Canara Bank.

Early life and education
He has a post graduate certificate from University of London.
Bachelor of Engineering from MSRIT.

International career
Prasad took 96 wickets from 33 Tests at an average of 35, and 196 wickets from 161 ODIs at an average of 32.30. Prasad was more effective on wickets that helped seam bowling even though his best Test bowling figures of 6 for 33, achieved against Pakistan in the 1999 Test series in India, came on a docile pitch in Chennai; these figures included a spell of bowling in which he took 5 wickets for 0 runs. Notably, he once took 10 wickets in a Test match in Durban, South Africa, in December 1996. It remains his only ten-wicket haul in Test cricket. Prasad also took five-wicket hauls in England, in 1996, in Sri Lanka, in 2001, and in the West Indies, in 1997. In the 1996/97 season, he took 55 wickets in 15 Tests and 48 wickets in 30 ODIs. For the period, he was named the CEAT International Cricketer of the Year. He received the Arjuna Award in 2000.  

Prasad played his final Test match in Sri Lanka in 2001. One of his finest moments came in 1996 Cricket World Cup when after being hit for a boundary and openly sledged by Pakistan batsman Aamir Sohail, Prasad, on the very next ball, clean bowled Sohail, which was a key turning point of the match, which helped India win the game. Prasad was known for his slow leg cutters and was one of its first proponents in world cricket.

Injury and late career
Prasad struggled with injuries and dipping form towards the end of his career. He was dropped from the Indian team after the 2001 test series in Sri Lanka. Prasad tried unsuccessfully to make a comeback after that before retiring from all forms of cricket in May 2005, having secured two Ranji Trophy championships with Karnataka. He was made coach of the India Under-19 Cricket team in January. He was the coach of the U-19 team that finished runners-up in the 2006 U-19 Cricket World Cup.

Coaching career
After the disappointing performance of the Indian Team in World Cup 2007, Prasad was appointed as the bowling coach of the team for the Bangladesh Tour in May. It was his return to the Indian team after a span of 3 years. On 15 October 2009, Venkatesh Prasad  was sacked by the BCCI, which did not give any reasons for the unceremonious dumping.

He was appointed as bowling coach for Kings XI Punjab. He was also the coach of Royal Challengers Bangalore during their inaugural season in 2008.

Personal life
His mother tongue is Kannada. Prasad is married to Jayanthi.

References

External links 
 

1969 births
Coaches of the Indian national cricket team
Cricketers from Bangalore
India One Day International cricketers
India Test cricketers
Indian cricketers
Indian cricket coaches
Indian Premier League coaches
Karnataka cricketers
Living people
Recipients of the Arjuna Award
South Zone cricketers
Recipients of the Rajyotsava Award 2006
Alumni of University of London Worldwide
Alumni of the University of London